Mary Goode (born 15 May 1979) is a former Ireland women's field hockey international. She has also played senior club field hockey for Pembroke Wanderers and Hermes.

Domestic teams
Goode was a Pembroke Wanderers player when she made her senior Ireland debut. During the 2005–06 season Goode played for Cork Harlequins after moving to Cork for work. In 2006–07 she re-joined Pembroke Wanderers. Together with Natalie Fulton, she was a member of the Wanderers women's team that lost 1–0 to Pegasus in the Irish Senior Cup final. In the final Goode saved from six penalty corners. In 2008 she was a member of the Wanderers team that were runners up in the European Cup Winners Cup. Between 2008 and 2010 Goode played for Bray in Leinster Division One before retiring from senior club field hockey. During the 2010–11 season, Goode coached and played as an outfield player for Suttonians, helping them reach the Leinster Division 3/4 Cup final. During the 2011–12 season Goode temporarily returned to senior club field hockey when she joined Hermes. In May 2012, together with Audrey O'Flynn and Gillian Pinder, Goode was a member of the Hermes team that won the Women's EuroHockey Club Champion's Challenge I.

Ireland international
Goode was first called up for a senior Ireland squad in 2003. She had previously represented Ireland at under-16 level. After retiring as an Ireland international, Goode remained involved with the team. Initially as an assistant coach/goalkeeper coach with the under-18 team   and later as the senior Ireland women's team manager.

Honours
Hermes
Women's EuroHockey Club Champion's Challenge I
Winners: 2012
Pembroke Wanderers
European Cup Winners Cup
Runners Up: 2008
Irish Senior Cup
Runners Up: 2006–07

References

1979 births
Living people
Ireland international women's field hockey players
Irish female field hockey players
Irish field hockey coaches
Pembroke Wanderers Hockey Club players
Field hockey players from County Dublin
Female field hockey goalkeepers